Blackridge railway station is a railway station on the North Clyde Line. It serves the village of Blackridge in West Lothian, Scotland.

History 

The original station in this locale was called Westcraigs, built by the Bathgate and Coatbridge Railway. It was also the site of a junction with the Wilsontown, Morningside and Coltness Railway. Opened on 11 August 1862, in some timetables the station was called Westcraigs for Harthill. The station closed on 9 January 1956.

Opening

Blackridge was originally excluded from the Airdrie–Bathgate rail link project, but after a three-year campaign by the local community, funding was approved by the Scottish Government at a cost of £5 million. Private housing developer Manorlane agreed to fund 40% of the costs. However, it closed and the funding promise expired. West Lothian Council agreed to take on the burden and expects to recoup the cost from additional expansion in the area. The station opened on 12 December 2010 on a new site, some 600 metres closer to Edinburgh than the previous Westcraigs station.

Services
In the evenings and on Sundays the westbound terminus is  rather than Milngavie.

References

Notes

Sources

 
 
 West Craigs station on navigable OS map

External links

Railway stations in West Lothian
Railway stations opened by Network Rail 
Railway stations in Great Britain opened in 2010
2010 establishments in Scotland
Railway stations served by ScotRail